Hot or the acronym HOT may refer to:

Food and drink
Pungency, in food, a spicy or hot quality
Hot, a wine tasting descriptor

Places
Hot district, a district of Chiang Mai province, Thailand
Hot subdistrict, a sub-district of Hot District, Thailand
Tha Kham, Chiang Mai, also known as Hot, a town in Hot District, Chiang Mai province, Thailand
Hot, Albania, a village in the Malësi e Madhe municipality, Shkodër County, Albania

Music
H.O.T. pronounced "H. O. T.", (High-Five of Teenagers), a South Korean boy band
Hawaii Opera Theatre, an opera company in Honolulu, Hawaii
Hot (American vocal group), best known for 1977 hit "Angel in Your Arms" 1976–1980
Hot 97, branding for hip-hop radio station WQHT in New York City

Albums
Hot (Freda Payne album), 1979
Hot (Half Japanese album), 1995
Hot (Inna album) or the title song (see below), 2009
Hot (James Brown album) or the title song (see below), 1976
Hot (Mel B album), 2000
Hot (Paul Bley album), 1985
Hot (Squirrel Nut Zippers album), 1996
 Hot (EP), by Taeyang, or the title song, 2008

Songs
"Hot" (Avril Lavigne song), 2007
"Hot" (Beatnuts song), 2004
"Hot" (Inna song), 2008
"Hot" (Pia Mia song), 2020
"Hot" (Young Thug song), 2019
"Hot (I Need to Be Loved, Loved, Loved)", by James Brown, 1975
"Hot", by Aya Nakamura from Aya, 2020
"Hot!", by Lisa Lopes from Supernova, 2001
"Hot", by Parah Dice, 2019
"Hot", by Smash Mouth from Get the Picture?, 2003
"Hot", by Twice from Fancy You, 2019

Transport
Head-of-train device, a console for the end-of-train device
High-occupancy toll lane, a variable toll payable by some road users
HOT, the IATA and FAA LID codes for Memorial Field Airport in the state of Arkansas, US
HOT, the MTR station code for Ho Tin stop in Hong Kong, China
HOT, the National Rail code for Henley-on-Thames railway station in the county of Oxfordshire, UK

Other uses
HOT Bowl or C.H.A.M.P.S. Heart of Texas Bowl, a college football game
HOT (missile), an anti-tank missile system
A series of psychedelic phenethylamines:
HOT-2
HOT-7
HOT-17
Hawaii Ocean Time-series, an oceanographic time-series study
Highly optimized tolerance, a general framework for studying complexity
Higher-order thought, a concept in higher-order thought theories of consciousness
Hot (Israel), an Israeli cable company
Hawkes Ocean Technologies, a developer of deep sea equipment
Hot, cold, wet, and dry are aspects of the discredited theory of humorism

See also

Heat
Hots (disambiguation)
Hot Hot Hot (disambiguation)
Hot zone (disambiguation)
Hotspot (disambiguation)
Hotbox (disambiguation)